State Route 234 (SR 234) is a state highway located in central Maine. SR 234 exists in two separate segments connected by a  section of SR 27.

Route description
SR 234 begins at the Sandy River just east of downtown Strong as a spur from SR 149, which connects with SR 4 and SR 145 in the town center before running south on the east bank of the river. SR 234 heads due east on Norton Hill Road, passing to the south of Porter Lake and crossing into New Vineyard, where it becomes Lake Street and intersect SR 27 (New Vineyard Road). SR 234 turns north onto SR 27 and the two routes run concurrently for  before SR 234 turns east again onto Anson Valley Road towards the town of Anson in Somerset County. In Anson, SR 234 briefly runs along the southern bank of the Carrabassett River before terminating in North Anson at US 201A / SR 8 near their intersection with SR 16 and the confluence of the Carrabassett and Kennebec rivers.

Signage as of September 2013 indicates a concurrency of SR 149 and SR 234 heading northwest into downtown Strong. However, state route logs do not show this concurrency.

History
SR 234 was designated in 1956 over entirely new routing. Its alignment has not changed since.

Junction list

See also

References

External links

234
Transportation in Franklin County, Maine
Transportation in Somerset County, Maine